The Louisiana Museum of Modern Art is an art museum located on the shore of the Øresund Sound in Humlebæk,  north of Copenhagen, Denmark. It is the most visited art museum in Denmark, and has an extensive permanent collection of modern and contemporary art, dating from World War II to the present day; in addition, it has a comprehensive programme of special exhibitions. The museum is also acknowledged as a milestone in modern Danish architecture, and is noted for its synthesis of art, architecture, and landscape, such as was showcased in an installation entitled "Riverbed" shown in 2014–2015. The museum occasionally also stages exhibitions of work by the great impressionists and expressionists, such as Claude Monet, who was the focus of a major exhibition in 1994.

The museum is included in the Patricia Schultz book 1,000 Places to See Before You Die and ranks 85th on a list of the most visited art museums in the world (2011).

Location
From the regional train station in Humlebæk, it takes 10–15 minutes to walk to the museum.

History
The name of the museum derives from the first owner of the property, Alexander Brun, who named the villa after his three wives, all called Louise.
The museum was created in 1958 by Knud W. Jensen, the owner at the time. He contacted architects Vilhelm Wohlert and Jørgen Bo who spent a few months walking around the property before deciding how a new construction would best fit into the landscape. This study resulted in the first version of the museum consisting of three buildings connected by glass corridors. Since then it has been extended several times until it reached its present circular shape in 1991.

In late November 2012, Louisiana Museum of Modern Art launched Louisiana Channel, a web-TV channel contributing to the development of the museum as a cultural platform.

In 2013, the museum's music department launched Louisiana Music, a webpage dedicated to musical videos produced by the museum in collaboration with world-famous musicians.

Collections

Modern art
The museum has a wide range of modern art paintings, sculptures and videos dating from World War II to the present day, including works by artists such as Roy Lichtenstein, Andy Warhol, Anselm Kiefer, Alberto Giacometti, Pablo Picasso, Yves Klein, Robert Rauschenberg, David Hockney and Asger Jorn.  The videos are often housed in room settings where the viewer is made to feel part of the scene being portrayed.  Perched above the sea, there is a sculpture garden between the museum's two wings with works by artists including Henry Moore, Alexander Calder, and Jean Arp.

Wessel-Bagge collection
Besides the collection of modern art, Louisiana also displays a collection of Pre-Columbian art. Consisting of more than 400 objects, the collection was a donation from the Wessel-Bagge Foundation in 2001. It is the personal collection left by Niels-Wessel Bagge, a California-based Danish dancer, choreographer, and art collector, who died in 1990.

Exhibitions 
The Louisiana Museum mounts temporary exhibitions, including installations such as Danish-Icelandic artist Olafur Eliasson's site-specific work "Riverbed", which was made specifically for the museum and shown from August 2014 to January 2015. The work was in three sections with a theme that related art, architecture and nature, in which a rocky riverbed was created to take up the museum's entire south wing.

Concert hall
The Concert Hall was built in 1976 in connection with the West Wing which had been built in 1966 and 1971. Its acoustics make it especially suitable for chamber music, but it is also used for other musical genres as well as a wide array of others events and activities such as debates, lectures and symposiums. The chairs are designed by Poul Kjærholm and the rear wall is decorated with paintings created for the site by Sam Francis.

In 2007 began a project to produce concerts filming and musical clips directed by Stéphan Aubé. All the movies are available for free on the Louisiana Music website.

Sculpture garden

The grounds around the museum contain a landscaped sculpture garden. It consists of a plateau and ground that slopes towards the Øresund and is dominated by huge, ancient specimen trees and sweeping vistas of the sea.

It contains works by such artists as Jean Arp, Max Ernst, Max Bill, Alexander Calder, Henri Laurens, Louise Bourgeois, Joan Miró and Henry Moore. The sculptures are either placed so that they can be viewed from within, in special sculpture yards or independently around the gardens, forming a synthesis with the lawns, the trees and the sea. There are also examples of site-specific art by such artists as Enzo Cucchi, Dani Karavan and George Trakas.

Louisiana Literature Festival
Louisiana Literature festival is an annual festival that takes place at the Louisiana Museum of Modern Art. Launched in 2010, the festival each year features about forty writers from across the world. They perform on stages around the museum and in the sculpture park, and attract more than 15,000 people each year.

Directors
1958 —1993: Knud W. Jensen
1995 —: Lars Nittve
1998 —: Steingrim Laursen
2000 —: Poul Erik Tøjner

Partners and sponsors

Partners 
Republic of Fritz Hansen is the Louisiana's main corporate partner through 2024.

Sponsors 
UBS sponsors programs and exhibitions at Louisiana. Realdania has supported Louisiana'a architectural exhibitions since 2006. The new Carlsberg foundation has supported Louisiana's acquisition programme generously throughout most of the museum's history.

References

External links 

 
 
 

Sculpture gardens, trails and parks in Denmark
Concert halls in Denmark
Modern art museums
Contemporary art galleries in Denmark
Event venues established in 1958
Art museums established in 1958
1958 establishments in Denmark
Museums in the Capital Region of Denmark
Art exhibitions in Denmark
Art museums and galleries in Denmark